Metropolitan Michael I of Kiev (died June 15, 992) is considered to be the first Metropolitan of Kiev and All-Rus' from 988-992. He is also considered to be a saint. June 15 and September 30  are dedicated to him on the Julian Calendar.

Different historical accounts state that he was either Assyrian or Bulgarian. He is traditionally accounted as founding the St. Michael's Golden-Domed Monastery in Kiev as well as the Mezhyhirskyi Monastery near Vyshhorod with Greek monks in 988 AD.

His remains were originally located in the Church of the Tithes, then they were moved to the Near Caves of the Kiev Pechersk Lavra, and are now located in the Dormition Cathedral of the lavra.

Michael's feast day is observed on June 15 (death day), September 30 (Translation), and formerly (with Anthony of Kiev and Theodosius of Kiev) on September 2.

References

10th-century Christian saints
Russian people of Assyrian descent
992 deaths
Metropolitans of Kiev and all Rus' (988–1441)
Eastern Orthodox missionaries